Remifentanilic acid is a metabolite of the potent short-acting synthetic opioid analgesic drug remifentanil.  It is an analog of fentanyl and remifentanil, but is not active as an opioid in its own right.

See also
 3-Methylbutyrfentanyl
 4-Fluorobutyrfentanyl
 4-Fluorofentanyl
 α-Methylfentanyl
 Acetylfentanyl
 Benzylfentanyl
 Furanylfentanyl
 Homofentanyl
 List of fentanyl analogues

References

Further reading 

 
 
 
 
 

Synthetic opioids
Piperidines
Anilides
Mu-opioid receptor agonists
Carboxylic acids
Methyl esters